We Are Not Numbers (WANN) is a project for Palestinian and young adults worldwide designed to help them share their narratives (and those of their people) in their own words with the Western (English-speaking) Founded in 2015 by American journalist Pam Bailey under the umbrella of the Euro-Mediterranean Human Rights Monitor, a Geneva-based organization chaired by Dr. Ramy Abdu.

The project aims at training young youth to write about life in conflict-ridden areas. It operates by pairing developing English writers (ranging in age from 15 to about 30) with professional authors/reporters/communicators who mentor them on both their language and storytelling skills. Their essays, poems, features and news reports (as well as videos) have been widely quoted by Amos Trust, Huffington Post, Mondoweiss, the New Arab, The Palestine Chronicle, and +972 magazine.

Aim 
The primary purpose of the project is to create a new generation of writers and thinkers who can bring together a profound positive change to the victims' causes. Providing youth with intensive training in leadership, teamwork, critical thinking, and advocacy, the project aims to build their capacities in advocacy for human rights and related fields. It amplifies youth voices in educating the Western world on the realities of life under occupation.

History 
During the Israeli military attack against Palestinians in the summer of 2014, Ahmed Alnaouq’s 23-year-old brother, Ayman, was killed by an Israeli missile while simply walking on the street near his home Dir-Al-Balah. Ahmed sunk into depression from which he thought he would never return to normal life again. During this time, he met Pam Bailey, the former international secretary of Euro-Med Monitor, who encouraged him to write his story. The story resonated with and attracted a great deal of attention from people in the West. As a result, established and aspiring “word artists” from around the world joined with youth in Palestine, Lebanon and conflict-ridden areas in the MENA region to create We Are Not Numbers. 

Every six months, the project recruits more than 30 new young writers. Since 2015, more than 350 writers graduated from WANN and more than 1000 essays, stories, articles, and poems had been published.

Partners 
WANN reached out and become friends with over 30 NGOs and international human rights groups, such as The French Coalition of 30 NGOs, Amos Trust, Nonviolence International, Global Voices, AJ+, Kinder USA, Adalah Justice Project, CCFD, Palestine Chronicle, The USA Palestine Mental Health, Canada Talks Israel/Palestine, Jewish Voice for Peace, and Podcast Latitude Adjustment.

Programs

Gaza Thinks Initiative 
WANN launched the Gaza Thinks Initiative under the Rethink, Reconnect the Med Initiative within the EU-funded regional Program Med Dialogue for Rights and Equality framework. It aims to learn youth how to employ critical thinking tools to own the narrative and combat misinformation, stereotypes, fake news, and hate speech.

Gaza-Vision 
We are Not Numbers expanded its focus with Gaza vision, an answer to Eurovision, the singing contest held in Tel Aviv. More than 25 singers from across Gaza entered Gazavision. Media in countries ranging from Australia to the Netherlands covered the event.

WANN Reports 
This program aims at helping WANN writers get paid articles, features, or opinions. WANN practices its social responsibility towards WANN writers by connecting them with international news agencies and expanding their professional network.

Films 

 Art from Palestine.
 Gaza Archhelogical sites-Downtown.
 Church of Saint Porphyrius.
 Saint Hilarion Monastery.
 Al-Bared Refugee Camp: Waste Dump.

Books 

 We Are Not Numbers (2019)

WANN stories published in books 

 Always on the inside looking out - The Spy's Gamble.

References

Organizations established in 2015
Projects in Asia
Gaza Strip
Human rights in the State of Palestine